Eudora is a collection of B-sides, rarities, and covers by The Get Up Kids. It was released on November 27, 2001, via Vagrant Records.

Named after the Kansas town Eudora, the CD contains a number of cover songs which had been recorded for singles or compilations, by artists such as David Bowie, The Pixies, The Cure, and The Replacements. The song "Central Standard Time" originally appeared on a split 7-inch with The Anniversary, and the song "Burned Bridges" is a cover of the song "Harvest of Maturity" by the Metalcore band Coalesce, and the song originally appeared on a split 7-inch between the two groups, each band choosing one of the other bands' songs and re-working it.

Track listing

Personnel

Band
Matt Pryor - Guitar, Vocals
James Dewees - Keyboards, Vocals
Jim Suptic - Guitar, Vocals
Rob Pope - Bass
Ryan Pope - Drums
Additional Musicians
Josh Berwanger - Keyboards
Noah Sikes - Cello

Production
Chad Blinman - Producer, Engineer, Mixing
Alex Brahl - Vocals, Producer, Engineer
Jay Gordon - Engineer
Dale Lawton - Engineer
AJ Mogis - Producer, Engineer
Ed Rose - Producer, Engineer, Mixing, Photography
Don Zientara - Engineer

Chart positions

References

2001 compilation albums
The Get Up Kids albums
Albums produced by Ed Rose
Vagrant Records compilation albums